Rhinocoeta is a genus of colorful beetles belonging to the subfamily Cetoniinae, family Scarabaeidae.

Taxonomy
Subgenus Rhinocoeta Burmeister, 1842
 Rhinocoeta armata Boheman, 1857
 Rhinocoeta cornuta (Fabricius, 1781)
 Rhinocoeta jenisi Krajcik, 2006
 Rhinocoeta limbaticollis Péringuey, 1901
 Rhinocoeta maraisi Holm, 1992
 Rhinocoeta sanguinipes (Gory & Percheron, 1833)
Subgenus Haematonotus Kraatz, 1880
 Rhinocoeta leonardi Beinhundner, 2013
 Rhinocoeta ruteri Basilewsky, 1956
 Rhinocoeta turbida (Boheman, 1860)
 Rhinocoeta hauseri (Kraatz, 1896)

References

External links
 Rhinocoeta
  Rhinocoeta sanguinipes
 Rhinocoeta cornuta

Scarabaeidae genera